Tornielli is a surname. Notable people with the surname include:

Andrea Tornielli (born 1964), Italian journalist and religious writer
Antonio Tornielli (1579–1650), Italian Roman Catholic bishop
Bonaventura Tornielli (1411–1491), Italian Roman Catholic priest 
Girolamo Francesco Tornielli (died 1752), Italian Jesuit, preacher and writer